South African Taekwondo Federation is the governing body for the sport of taekwondo in South Africa and a member of the world governing body,  World Taekwondo (WT) (formerly called World Taekwondo Federation) along with the continental governing body, African Taekwondo Union (AFTU). South African Taekwondo Federation is also registered with the South African Sports Confederation and Olympic Committee.

South African Taekwondo Federation organises national competitions including the Ambassadors Cup, which is a popular fixture on its calendar, organised in partnership with the Korean Embassy in South Africa, and held annually since 2009.

Taekwondo practitioners

See also

Sport in South Africa

References

External links
 
 World Taekwondo official website
 African Taekwondo Union official website

Taekwondo
National members of World Taekwondo
Taekwondo organizations
National Taekwondo teams